The Baraza-Kerubo Village Market incident refers to an incident between the then Kenyan Deputy Chief Justice Nancy Makokha Baraza and Rebecca Kerubo who worked as a guard at the Village Market shopping mall in Nairobi. The incident led to the suspension and subsequent resignation of the Deputy Chief justice after less than one year in office.
The village market saga was condemned by many and termed unethical after Nancy Baraza withdrew a gun on the female guard.

Initial Media Reports
In January 2012, local media reported that an incident had occurred between the Deputy Chief Justice and a security guard. The Deputy Chief Justice Nancy Baraza issued a statement denying the allegations

JSC Probe
In January 2012, the Judicial Service Commission formed a sub-committee to investigate reports that Deputy Chief Justice Nancy Baraza assaulted a security guard at the Village Market shopping mall on 31 December 2011.

Suspension and Tribunal
The JSC subsequently recommended her suspension to President Mwai Kibaki and requested the President to appoint a tribunal to investigate her conduct in line with Article 168 (4) of the Constitution. After her suspension, a commission formed to investigate her conduct recommended her removal from office.

Supreme Court Appeal
On 9 August 2012, Justice Baraza filed a notice of appeal against a tribunal's recommendation that she should be sacked. She said she was "dissatisfied" with the decision

Resignation Aftermath
On 18 October, Baraza resigned after withdrawing her supreme court appeal of the tribunal's verdict.

See also
 Judicial Service Commission (Kenya)
 Supreme Court of Kenya

References

2012 in Kenya
Law of Kenya
History of Kenya